Sport Lisboa e Benfica, commonly known as Benfica, is a canoeing team based in Lisbon, Portugal. Benfica's canoeing section is composed of men and women teams. It was created amid the club's "Olympic Project" in 2010, set to develop athletes to represent Portugal at the Summer Olympic Games.

Technical staff and athletes

Honours

Joana Vasconcelos
 Portuguese Women's K1 1000M Sprint Championship:
 Winner (1): 2012

João Ribeiro
 Portuguese Championship Men's K1 1000M in Regatta in Line:
 Winner (1): 2012
 Portuguese Championship Men's K1 500M in Regatta in Line:
 Winner (1): 2012
 Portuguese Championship Men's K1 200M in Regatta in Line:
 Winner (1): 2012

Teresa Portela
 Portuguese Cup Women's K1 500M in Regatta in Line:
 Winner (1): 2012
 Portuguese Cup Women's K1 200M in Regatta in Line:
 Winner (1): 2012

References

External links
  

 
Canoeing
Sport in Lisbon
2010 establishments in Portugal
Canoe clubs